The 2015 Kerala Sahitya Akademi Award was announced on 28 March 2017. The award is given each year, since 1958, by the Kerala Sahitya Akademi (Kerala Literary Academy), to Malayalam writers for their outstanding books of literary merit.

Winners

Endowments
I. C. Chacko Award: P. M. Girish (Arivum Bhashayum, Linguistics/Grammar/Scientific study)
C. B. Kumar Award: K. Aravindakshan (Adhikarathinte Aasakthikal, Essay)
K. R. Namboodiri Award: Dr. T. Arya Devi (Nyaya Darsanam, Medical literature)
Kanakasree Award: Santhi Jayakumar (Eerppam Niranja Murikal, Poetry)
Geetha Hiranyan Award: Aswathi Sasikumar (Josephinte Manam, Stories)
G. N. Pillai Award: Manoj Mathirappally (Jaiva Rashtreeyavum Janasanjayavum, Nonfiction)
Kuttippizha Award: No award in 2015

Fellowship

References

Kerala Sahitya Akademi Awards
Kerala Sahitya Akademi Awards